The Americas Zone was one of the three regional zones of the 1977 Davis Cup.

14 teams entered the Americas Zone in total, with 12 teams competing in the preliminary rounds to advance to the main draw and join the previous year's finalists Chile and South Africa. The winner of the main draw went on to compete in the Inter-Zonal Zone against the winners of the Eastern Zone and Europe Zone.

Argentina defeated the United States in the final and progressed to the Inter-Zonal Zone.

Preliminary rounds

Draw

First round
Bolivia vs. Peru

Uruguay vs. Ecuador

Venezuela vs. Colombia

Canada vs. Caribbean/West Indies

Qualifying round
Brazil vs. Bolivia

Argentina vs. Ecuador

Venezuela vs. United States

Canada vs. Mexico

Main draw

Draw

Quarterfinals
Brazil vs. Argentina

United States vs. Mexico

Semifinals
Argentina vs. Chile

United States vs. South Africa

Final
Argentina vs. United States

References

External links
Davis Cup official website

Davis Cup Americas Zone
Americas
Davis Cup
Davis Cup
Davis Cup